Bill Huck (born 9 March 1965, in Dresden) is a German racing cyclist who won the world championships in sprint 1989, 1990. He competed for the SC Dynamo Berlin / Sportvereinigung (SV) Dynamo.

References 

German male cyclists
1965 births
Living people
UCI Track Cycling World Champions (men)
Cyclists from Dresden
German track cyclists
East German male cyclists
People from Bezirk Dresden